Williston is a city in and the county seat of Williams County, North Dakota, United States. The 2020 census gave its population as 29,160, making Williston the sixth-largest city in North Dakota. The city's population nearly doubled between 2010 and 2020, due largely to the North Dakota oil boom.

Williston's newspaper is the daily Williston Herald. Williston is the home of Williston State College and the Miss North Dakota Scholarship Pageant.

History
Founded in 1887, Williston was named for Daniel Willis James, a merchant and capitalist, by his friend, railroad magnate James J. Hill.

Geography
Williston is located at the crossroads of U.S. Highways 2 and 85, near the confluence of the Yellowstone and Missouri rivers, at the upper end of the Lake Sakakawea reservoir.

Climate

Williston has a cold semi-arid climate; closely bordering upon a warm-summer humid continental climate. It is part of USDA Hardiness zone 4a. The average window for freezing temperatures is September 20 through May 21, allowing a growing season of 121 days; .

Due to the relative aridity, there are only 3.9 days per season where 24-hour snowfall exceeds .

Notes

Demographics

Williston is in northwestern North Dakota's booming oil patch, where adequate, affordable housing has become a concern since the 2010s.  According to a February 2014 article in Business Insider, Williston had the highest apartment rents in the United States. The 2010 census counted a population of 14,716, up from 12,680 in 2000, but the number of current residents is possibly significantly higher since the count does not include those living in temporary housing. In September 2011, the mayor estimated the actual population to be 20,000 persons. The aforementioned 2014 Business Insider story estimated that the population was over 30,000.

2020 census

As of the census of 2020, there were 29,160 people. The population density was 1,389 people per square mile. The racial makeup of the city was 78.87% White, 6.45% other races, 5.58% African-American, 5.02% two or more races, 2.78% Native American, 1.13% Asian, and 0.17% Native Hawaiian or Pacific Islander. 9.5% of the population identified as Hispanic or Latino.

The median age in the city was 30.4 years.

2010 census

As of the census of 2010, there were 14,716 people, 6,180 households, and 3,589 families residing in the city. The racial makeup of the city was 92.6% White, 0.3% African-American, 3.3% Native American or Alaska Native, 0.3% Asian, 0.4% from other races, and 3.0% from two or more races. Hispanics or Latinos of any race were 2.2% of the population.

There were 6,180 households, of which 29.0% had children under the age of 18 living with them, 44.6% were married couples living together, 9.0% had a female householder with no husband present, 4.5% had a male householder with no wife present, and 41.9% were non-families. 34.6% of all households were made up of individuals, and 12.3% had someone living alone who was 65 years of age or older. The average household size was 2.31 and the average family size was 2.99.

The median age in the city was 35.5 years. 23.6% of residents were under the age of 18; 10% were between the ages of 18 and 24; 26.7% were from 25 to 44; 25.4% were from 45 to 64; and 14.4% were 65 years of age or older. The gender makeup of the city was 51.0% male and 49.0% female.

2000 census

As of the census of 2000, there were 12,512 people, 5,255 households, and 3,205 families residing in the city. The population density was 1,794.1 per square mile (693.1/km). There were 5,912 housing units at an average density of 847.7 per square mile (327.5/km). The racial makeup of the city was 93.69% White, 0.17% African American, 3.65% Native American or Alaska Native, 0.24% Asian, 0.02% Pacific Islander, 0.17% from other races, and 2.06% from two or more races. Hispanics or Latinos of any race were 1.23% of the population.

The six leading ancestry groups in the city are Norwegian (47.8%), German (31.6%), Irish (9.6%), English (5.8%), Swedish (4.5%), Dutch (4.3%) and French (4.0%).

There were 5,255 households, of which 30.7% had children under the age of 18 living with them, 47.4% were married couples living together, 10.5% had a female householder with no husband present, and 39.0% were non-families. 34.1% of all households were made up of individuals, and 13.7% had someone living alone who was 65 years of age or older. The average household size was 2.30 and the average family size was 2.96.

The age distribution was 25.6% under the age of 18, 9.3% from 18 to 24, 25.8% from 25 to 44, 22.5% from 45 to 64, and 16.8% who were 65 years of age or older. The median age was 38 years. For every 100 females, there were 91.9 males. For every 100 females age 18 and over, there were 88.3 males.

The median income for a household in the city was $29,962, and the median income for a family was $38,713. Males had a median income of $29,578 versus $18,879 for females. The per capita income for the city was $16,656. About 11.3% of families and 13.4% of the population were below the poverty line, including 19.1% of those under age 18 and 7.8% of those age 65 or over.

Economy

Williston's economy, while historically based in agriculture and especially ranching, is increasingly being driven by the oil industry. The Williston Basin, named after the town, is a huge subterranean geologic feature known for its rich deposits of petroleum, coal, and potash. 

Williston developed over the Bakken formation, which by the end of 2012 was predicted to be producing more oil than any other site in the United States, surpassing even Alaska's Prudhoe Bay, the longtime leader in domestic output in the nation. The oil boom has been spurred here by the development of new technologies—such as Hydraulic fracturing—which enabled extraction from areas previously inaccessible.

In 1995, the U.S. Geological Survey estimated that there were 150 million barrels of oil "technically recoverable" from the Bakken shale. In April 2008, the number was said to be about four billion barrels; in 2010 geologists at Continental Resources, the major drilling operation in North Dakota, estimated the reserve at eight billion. In March 2012, after the discovery of a lower shelf of oil, it announced a possible 24 billion barrels. Although current technology allows for extraction of only about 6% of the oil trapped  beneath the earth's surface, recoverable oil might eventually exceed 500 billion barrels.

Williston has seen a huge increase in population and infrastructure investments during the last several years with expanded drilling using the Hydraulic Fracturing petroleum extraction technique in the Bakken Formation and Three Forks Groups.  Examples of oil industry-related infrastructure investments are the multi-acre branch campus of Baker Hughes and the Sand Creek Retail Center.

A major regional grain elevator is served by the BNSF Railway. Williston's livestock arena has weekly auctions.

Forts Union and Buford, as well as the nearby confluence of the Yellowstone and Missouri Rivers west of the city, associated with the history of the Lewis and Clark Expedition and development of the fur trade and frontier—are destinations for area tourism. Williston is also comparatively close to the North Unit of Theodore Roosevelt National Park.

Arts and culture

Sites of interest
 Fort Union Trading Post National Historic Site – a reconstructed fur-trade era fort owned and maintained by the National Park Service.
 Fort Buford – a pioneer age military fort. An interesting site is the military graveyard.
 Missouri-Yellowstone Confluence Interpretive Center – A museum highlighting the history of the area where the Missouri River and the Yellowstone River merge.
 Lake Sakakawea – a large man-made lake located close to Williston. The lake offers plenty of recreational activities.
 The Confluence – where the Missouri River and the Yellowstone River meet. A historical center, boat ramp, camp site, and bike path are located here.
 Eagle Ridge Golf Club – an eighteen-hole golf course located on Highway 2 north of Williston. It measures  from the back tees.
 Williston Municipal Golf Course – a 9-hole golf course located at 3600 42nd Street West in Williston.
 The Links of North Dakota at Red Mike Resort – an 18-hole links course east of Williston.  Golfweek ranked it 41st among America's 100 best modern courses in 1997, 75th in 1998, and 81st in 1999.
 Cut Bluff Overlook – a historic site located about two miles (3 km) east of Williston on the south side of Highway 1804. Commemorating Lewis and Clark's campsite near Cut Bluff on the south banks of the Missouri River.
 James Memorial Art Center – Originally the community library (est 1911), The James was added to the National Register of Historic Places in 1979.It now serves as an art & cultural center for the community, offering art exhibits and art classes.
 Old Armory – The Old Armory was built in 1915 and listed on the National Register of Historic Places in 1985. The Old Armory is now home to community theater non-profit organization Entertainment, Inc!, founded in 1981. Entertainment, Inc! produces five shows each year.
 Williston Area Recreation Center – a 234,000 square foot recreation center, built in 2014, that includes an indoor surfing, golf simulators, and a water park. There are also the more traditional tennis and basketball courts, along with turf fields and an indoor track.

Sports
 Williston Keybirds of North Dakota American League Baseball
 Williston State College Tetons: women's and men's basketball, women's volleyball, men's ice hockey, women's softball and men's baseball.

Education

The Williston Basin School District 7 serves the entire city, with Williston High School as its public high school.

Due to a merger of the Williston Public School District #1 and the Williams County School District 8 (formerly New School District) in 2021, Williston has one school district. Previously almost all of the city was in the former with small sections in the latter. Prior to 2021, District 8, which was K–8 only, sent high school students to Williston High. District 8 also sent high school students to the Nesson School District in Ray and to the Tioga School District in Tioga.

Trinity Christian School is a private K–12 school, and St. Joseph Catholic School (of the Roman Catholic Diocese of Bismarck) a private K–6 school, both located in Williston.

Williston State College, on University Avenue, was founded in 1961 as the University of North Dakota—Williston (UND-W). It is a two-year public college in the North Dakota University System (NDUS). Students can earn Associate in Arts (AA), Associate in Science (AS), and Associate of Applied Science (AAS) degrees, and transfer to the state universities offering four-year programs and degrees.

The Williston Public Library serves as the public library for all of Williams County. The library also has a bookmobile that serves rural schools and retirement home communities. The main library also serves as a community center, hosting many groups that hold public meetings there. 

The library hosts an annual fundraiser called "Table of Contents", for which local patrons create unique table arrangements and dining themes. Proceeds are used to purchase equipment for local organizations that hold public meetings at the library. Numerous public events, including voting stations, are regularly held at the library.

The first Williston Public Library was completed in town in 1911, opening February 27, 1911, and it operated as the only facility until 1983. In the early 1990s the city began to address the issue of probable demolition of this aged building to replace it with one meeting modern needs.  

In 1993 a concerned group of citizens formed the James Memorial Preservation Society to save the historic building and develop it as a center for the visual arts. After the library moved to a new building on Davidson Drive, this structure became known as the James Memorial Art Center. It was adapted for use as an art gallery and event center. The James Memorial Art Center now hosts an annual Art Fest, art classes for youth and adults, and exhibits by local, national, and international artists.

Media

Print
 Williston Herald
 Plains Reporter
 Oil Patch Hotline
 The Christian Weekly
 The Williston Trader
The Shopper

Television
 4.1  KWSE (PBS) Prairie Public Television
 4.2  World
 4.3  Minnesota Channel
 4.4  Lifelong Learning
 8.1  KUMV (NBC)
 8.2  Fox
 8.3  Me-TV
 11.1 KXMD (CBS)
 11.2 The CW
 11.3 Laff
 11.4 Escape
 38.1 KXND-LP (Fox; rebroadcasts KUMV-TV 8.2)

In the late 1970s and early 1980s, KXMD and KUMV were rebroadcast across Saskatchewan as part of that region's first terrestrial-based cable television system. By 1984, however, the Williston signals had been replaced by those of similar stations in Detroit.

Radio

FM
 88.1 K201FJ CSN network – Christian
 89.5 KPPR North Dakota Public Radio/NPR affiliate
 90.3 K212DW K-LOVE network – contemporary Christian music
 90.7 KJND-FM Your Network of Praise – Christian
 91.7 K219CB American Family Radio network – Christian
 93.1  KGCX "Eagle 93" Classic rock – based in Sidney, Montana
 95.1  KTHC "Power 95.1" Hot Adult Contemporary
 96.1  KYYZ "Z96.1 Country Thunder" Country
 101.1  KDSR "Hot 101" Jack FM
 102.7  KHRT translator – contemporary christian music
AM
 660  KEYZ "Keyz NewsRadio" News/Talk/Country
 1070  KATQ Country – based in Plentywood, Montana
 1090  KTGO Country – based in Tioga

Infrastructure

Transportation

Air
The city of Williston is served by the Williston Basin International Airport, which has a customs service in its facilities. The facility opened in October 2019, replacing Sloulin Field International Airport.

In 2012, United Airlines began offering daily codeshare jet service (via ExpressJet Airlines) to Denver, CO (KDEN) on Embraer 145 aircraft, while Delta Air Lines began daily codeshare jet service (via SkyWest Airlines) to Minneapolis, MN (MSP) on Bombardier CRJ200 aircraft. In August 2014, United began offering direct flights to Houston TX.

FedEx Express of Memphis, TN, provides cargo flights to and from the Williston, ND Airport and Grand Forks, ND (GFK) airport utilizing Cessna 208B Caravans with CargoMaster cargo pods. These flights run Monday through Saturday. The Saturday service has an early cutoff time and pickups are limited to in-town stops and drop box locations only.

Rail
Amtrak, the national passenger rail system, serves a station in Williston via its Empire Builder, a once-daily train in each direction between Portland, Oregon/Seattle, Washington, and Chicago.

Highways

US 2 runs through the city. US 85 bypasses the city to the northwest, and US 85B bypasses the city to the northeast. ND 1804 runs through the southern portion of the city and is concurrent with US 2 between 143rd Avenue, and 2nd Street.

Health care
Williston clinics include Craven-Hagan Clinic, Fairlight Medical Center, and Trinity Community Clinic-Western Dakota. Fairlight has the only Veteran's Affairs clinic in northwestern North Dakota and also serves residents of northeastern Montana. Fairlight includes a walk-in clinic with four health care professionals. Mercy Medical Center is the Williston hospital. It provides 24-hour emergency and trauma care but lacks a walk-in clinic.

Mercy Medical Center is home to the Leonard P. Nelson Family Cancer Treatment Center (est. 1996), providing oncology services in the region for the past seventeen years to an area of a 100-mile radius. Patients receive treatment for a wide variety of cancers including breast, gynecologic, head and neck, lung and prostate. Mercy Medical Center broke ground August 24, 2012 on an expanded cancer treatment facility. Improvements include the installation of a highly specialized linear accelerator to increase precision radiation therapy treatment delivery with decreased patient treatment time. The grand opening was October 7, 2013.

Mercy Medical Center was named among the Top 100 Critical Access Hospitals (CAHs) in the United States by The Joint Commission on Accreditation of Healthcare Organizations in September 2012.

Notable people

 James A. Abrahamson, retired USAF officer and first head of the Strategic Defense Initiative a.k.a. "Star Wars"
 Larry Bergh, selected by the Chicago Bulls in the 1969 NBA draft, but never played
 James R. Carrigan, United States District Court judge and Colorado Supreme Court justice, practiced law in Williston
 Michael Dwyer, member of the North Dakota Senate
 Sally Fraser, actress, born in Williston
 Virgil Hill, silver medalist Olympic boxer (1984), four-time world champion boxer who lost his title to Xue Li
 Darlene Hooley, congresswoman from Oregon
 Phil Jackson, 11-time NBA championship head coach
 Mark Lee, pitcher with the Kansas City Royals, Milwaukee Brewers, and Baltimore Orioles
 Brent Qvale, professional football player
 Brian Qvale, professional basketball player

See also
 Williston (Amtrak station)
 Williston Herald

Notes

References

External links

 Williston Visitors Center

 
1887 establishments in Dakota Territory
Cities in North Dakota
Cities in Williams County, North Dakota
County seats in North Dakota
Micropolitan areas of North Dakota
North Dakota populated places on the Missouri River
Populated places established in 1887